Houston (also Liberty Hill) is an unincorporated community in Heard County, Georgia, United States. Its elevation is 833 feet (254 m), and it is located at  (33.1595654, -85.1377196).

History
The community was named after Reverend H. W. Houston, a local minister. The Georgia General Assembly incorporated the place in 1840 as the Village of Houston.  The town's charter was dissolved in 1995.

References

Former municipalities in Georgia (U.S. state)
Unincorporated communities in Heard County, Georgia
Populated places disestablished in 1995
Populated places established in 1840